The 1997 NHL Entry Draft was the 35th NHL Entry Draft. It was held at the Civic Arena in Pittsburgh, Pennsylvania, on June 21, 1997.

As of 2022, the only remaining active player in the NHL from the 1997 draft class is Joe Thornton.

Selections by round
Club teams are located in North America unless otherwise noted.

Round one

Round two

Round three

Round four

Round five

Round six

Round seven

Round eight

Round nine

Draftees based on nationality

Active Players

See also
 1997–98 NHL season
 List of NHL first overall draft choices
 List of NHL players

References

External links
 prosportstransactions.com: 1997 NHL Entry Draft Pick
 NHL.com: NHL.com - Players
 1997 NHL Entry Draft player stats at The Internet Hockey Database

Draft
National Hockey League Entry Draft
1990s in Pittsburgh